The Boia Mică is a right tributary of the river Boia Mare in Romania. Its source is in the Făgăraș Mountains.

References

Rivers of Romania
Rivers of Vâlcea County